Sphaerotheca is a genus of true frogs. They can be found in South Asia. Molecular data suggest that they are closely related to Fejervarya, perhaps as a monophyletic group within a paraphyletic Fejervarya.

Species
There are currently 11 described species in Sphaerotheca:
 Spaerotheca bengaluru 
Sphaerotheca breviceps (Schneider, 1799)
 Sphaerotheca dobsoni (Boulenger, 1882)
 Sphaerotheca leucorhynchus (Rao, 1937)
 Sphaerotheca magadha Prasad, Dinesh, Das, Swamy, Shinde, and Vishnu, 2019
 Sphaerotheca maskeyi (Schleich and Anders, 1998)
 Sphaerotheca pashchima Padhye, Dahanukar, Sulakhe, Dandekar, Limaye, and Jamdade, 2017
 Sphaerotheca pluvialis (Jerdon, 1853)
 Sphaerotheca rolandae (Dubois, 1983)
 Sphaerotheca strachani (Murray, 1884)
 Sphaerotheca swani (Myers and Leviton, 1956)

References

Dicroglossidae
 
Amphibian genera
Frogs of Asia
Taxa named by Albert Günther